The Ansorge Hotel is a turn of the 20th century two-story hotel located in Curlew, Washington.  It was built in 1903 next to the Great Northern Railway. The hotel still has the bay windows and stamped sheet metal siding which looks like brick. Included in the many patrons of the hotel over the course of its operation is Henry Ford who stayed while visiting relatives in the region. It has been restored and contains many of the original fixtures and furniture.  It is operated as a museum, open on summer weekends.

See also
List of Registered Historic Places in Washington

References

External links

Ansorge Hotel Museum - Ferry County information
Ansorge Hotel entry

History of Washington (state)
Hotel buildings on the National Register of Historic Places in Washington (state)
Museums in Ferry County, Washington
Historic house museums in Washington (state)
Defunct hotels in Washington (state)
National Register of Historic Places in Ferry County, Washington
Hotel buildings completed in 1903
1903 establishments in Washington (state)